Recondo Technology (Recondo) is an American software technology corporation headquartered in Denver, Colorado. Recondo's cloud-based systems deliver automated, financial services to the healthcare industry.

As of September 2018, the company has more than 900 US hospital facilities as customers and connections to more than 800 commercial and government payers. The company was named Best in KLAS for patient access software & solutions by KLAS Research in 2018. In 2019, Recondo Technology was acquired by Waystar.

Acquisitions

In February 2012, Recondo acquired Trilogi, Inc., a revenue cycle management and recovery firm.

In December 2012, Recondo acquired eHC Solutions, a developer of advanced, Intelligent Electronic Data Interchange (EDI) solutions.

References

External links
 Recondo Technology official website

Health care companies based in Colorado
Software companies based in Colorado
Companies based in Greenwood Village, Colorado
American companies established in 2006
Software companies established in 2006
Health care companies established in 2006
Software companies of the United States
2006 establishments in Colorado